Mian Mian (born 28 August 1970 in Shanghai) is a Chinese Post 70s Generation writer. She writes on China's once-taboo topics and she is a promoter of Shanghai's local music. Her publications have earned her the reputation as China's literary wild child.

Her first novel, Candy, has been translated into English. Her other works include Every good child deserves to eat candy, a collection of short stories. Her novel We Are Panic was made into a movie, Shanghai Panic (2001), in which she also acted one of the lead roles.

In late 2009, she sued Google after the company scanned her books for its online library. She demanded  and a public apology. Google later removed the book from its library. She appeared in the 2013 documentary Google and the World Brain.

Bibliography
 啦啦啦 (lā lā lā, La la la), 1997
 糖 (Táng, Candy), 2000
 每个好孩子都有糖吃 (Měige Hǎoháizi Dōu Yǒu Táng Chī, Every good child deserves to eat candy), 2002
 社交舞 (Shèjiāo Wǔ, Social dance), 2002, (English: "Social dance", nonfiction)
 熊猫 (Xióngmāo, Panda), 2004

Translated works
Candy (糖 Táng), 2003

References

External links
An article by Gary Jones, first published in Tofu-magazine #2
China Daily article about Mian Mian

Short biography

1970 births
Living people
Post 70s Generation
Writers from Shanghai
Culture in Shanghai
20th-century Chinese women writers
20th-century Chinese writers
21st-century Chinese women writers
21st-century Chinese writers